Colonel Armen Karleni Poghosyan is a Soviet-educated Armenian military musician. Since 16 February 2009, he has been the Senior Military Director of the Band of the General Staff of the Armed Forces of Armenia and concurrently the commander of the Military Band Division of the General Staff. He is also a teacher at the Komitas State Conservatory of Yerevan.

Early life and career 

Poghosyan was born in Yerevan in 1961. He was the first musician in his family, with his mother and father being veteran engineers and his brother being in that field currently. He studied at the Tchaikovsky Secondary Music School in the capital for 8 years. In 1984, he graduated from the Musical College named after Romanos Melikian. After graduating from the college, he worked as an orchestra artist at the Yerevan Opera Theatre.
 
From 1985 to 1990, Poghosyan completed his studies at the Department of Military Conductors of the Moscow Conservatory where he received his certification as a military conductor. In 1990, he joined the Soviet Armed Forces becoming an official conductor for the bands of the Transcaucasian Military District. In 1992, he resigned from his position in the Soviet Army, and was invited to lead the newly formed Band of the General Staff of the Armed Forces of Armenia. He served in various leadership positions in the band until 16 February 2009, when he became the Commander and the Senior Military Director of the band division.

On 25 February 2021, he was one of 40 top Armenian officers who signed a statement drafted by Chief of the General Staff Onik Gasparyan calling for the resignation of Prime Minister Nikol Pashinyan.

Reputation

He is one of the few military officers to hold the title of Honored Artist of Armenia. He is commonly known for leading the band of the general staff during the parades on Republic Square in honor of the 5th, 8th, 15th, 20th, and 25th anniversaries of the Independence of Armenia, as well as the 100th anniversary of the founding of the First Armenian Republic. He also leads the band during Spasskaya Tower Military Music Festival and Tattoo on Red Square in Moscow in 2017. In 2013, Belarusian President Alexander Lukashenko thanked and praised Poghosyan during his state visit to Yerevan for what he considered a very good performance of the Belarusian Anthem (My Belarusy), telling Poghosyan as he inspected the honor guard:

“I have never heard our anthem played so well"

He authored many official marches, including the song "I have the honor" and "Adagio".

Awards
 Medal "For the Service to the Motherland" (1st and 2nd degree)
 Drastamat Kanayan Medal
 Medal of Marshal Baghramyan
 Medal for Impeccable Service (1st, 2nd, and 4th degrees)
 Andranik Ozanyan Medal
 Admiral Isakov Medal
 Nelson Stepanyan Medal
 Gold Medal of the Mayor of Yerevan
 Gold Medal of the Ministry of Culture
 Police Medal For Strengthening Cooperation
 Combat Service Medal
 Military Service Medal
 Presidential Gratitude Diploma (awarded by President Serzh Sargsyan)

See also 
 Semyon Tchernetsky
 Valery Khalilov
 John Philip Sousa

Notes

References 

1961 births
Musicians from Yerevan
Living people
Armenian conductors (music)
Armenian colonels
Moscow Conservatory alumni
Tchaikovsky Secondary Music School alumni
21st-century conductors (music)
Military musicians